Vrak (stylized as VRΔK)  is a Canadian French language specialty channel owned by Bell Media. The channel primarily broadcasts live-action programming aimed at youth audiences.

History

Background
The youth channel TVJQ went on the air in 1982 and was distributed by a subsidiary of Vidéotron. It was originally available only in the Montreal and Quebec City areas.

In 1986, the Canadian Radio-television and Telecommunications Commission (CRTC) granted a license to Vidéotron for its TVJQ channel to be carried over by other cable companies elsewhere. This made Vidéotron the first cable company in Canadian history to simultaneously be a producer of television content. However, TVJQ was intended to be temporary until a permanent channel for children would succeed it.

Le Canal Famille

Licensed by the CRTC  in 1987, Le Canal Famille was launched on September 1, 1988 as a replacement to TVJQ. Le Canal Famille was created  by Premier Choix TVEC which itself was already partially owned at the time by Astral Media (the predecessor of Bell Media).

Le Canal Famille, name translated as The Family Channel, which was the name of another Canadian youth channel that also began airing in 1988, as well as YTV (owned by Corus Entertainment).

VRAK

Le Canal Famille was renamed VRAK.TV on January 2, 2001. The channel switched to an ad-supported format in 2006 to coincide with the renewal of license and launch of HD feed.

Vrak.TV was separated from its sister channels in 2013 due to the acquisition of Astral Media by Bell Media; Bell sold off Family Channel, the French version of Disney Junior, the English version of Disney Junior and Disney XD to DHX Media, and MusiMax and MusiquePlus to V Media Group.

Vrak.TV was simply renamed to just Vrak on August 25, 2014.

On September 12, 2016, Vrak changed its audience focus to the ages 13–35 group due to the success of its Vrak2 block. Some series targeting its former audience focus moved to other stations.

Programming
Since its creation as Le Canal Famille, the channel airs animated series, teen sitcoms and light-hearted dramas. Many of them are French dubs of English-language programs such as Buffy the Vampire Slayer, Charmed, What I Like About You, Degrassi: The Next Generation, Gilmore Girls, One Tree Hill, The O.C., Life with Derek, Smallville, SpongeBob SquarePants, That '70s Show, 90210, Gossip Girl, and many others. It also aired programs from Disney Channel; due to the launch of La Chaîne Disney by Corus Entertainment, the last remaining Disney Channel show on the channel, Good Luck Charlie (Bonne chance Charlie in French), was removed from the schedule in September 2016. The channel also features local Quebec French language productions, such as Il était une fois dans le trouble and Une grenade avec ça?. Other series that the channel popularized were Dans une galaxie près de chez vous and Radio Enfer. As of 2010, the channel has aired films weekly.

Initially, as required by the Canadian Radio-television and Telecommunications Commission (CRTC), the channel carried no commercials until 2006. However, it aired promotional messages, interstitial programs (such as help segments known as R-Force (pronounced like "Air Force")), and public service announcements instead. The channel airs commercials as of 2006 with the launch of its HD feed and license renewal. Its former English-language counterpart (Family Channel) continued to be commercial-free until November 2016.

Unlike the other specialty channels, Vrak is the only channel on the air daily from 6am to midnight. When the station was Le Canal Famille, the station would close down at 7pm (8pm on weekends), sharing time with the flagship Super Écran channel (then also owned by Astral and now sharing Bell Media ownership with Vrak). In 2001, when the channel was revamped as VRAK.TV, its hours were increased to 10 p.m. (Super Écran followed on most systems). Vrak's current closedown time at midnight went into effect in mid-2005.

On September 12, 2016, due to the channel's changes in audience focus, its animation programming completely disappeared from the channel, eventually, they reappeared on the channel in January 2017, starting with SpongeBob SquarePants (Bob l'éponge in French).

Since May 2019, all remaining children programming on the channel has completely disappeared.

Vrak HD
On October 30, 2006, Astral Media launched an HD simulcast of Vrak.TV called Vrak.TV HD.

It is available on Bell Satellite TV, Bell Fibe TV, Cogeco, Optik TV, Rogers Cable, Shaw Direct and Vidéotron.

International distribution
 Saint Pierre and Miquelon (French overseas collectivity) - distributed on the SPM Telecom system.

See also
YTV - owned by Corus Entertainment
Family Channel - owned by DHX Media

References

External links
  

Analog cable television networks in Canada
Children's television networks in Canada
French-language television networks in Canada
Television channels and stations established in 1988
1988 establishments in Canada
Bell Media networks